Garczyn may refer to:

Garczyn, Gmina Liniewo (Pomeranian Voivodeship, Poland)
Garczyn, Gmina Kościerzyna (Pomeranian Voivodeship, Poland)